The BN-1200 reactor is a sodium-cooled fast breeder reactor project, under development by OKBM Afrikantov in Zarechny, Russia. The BN-1200 is based on the earlier BN-600 and especially BN-800, with which it shares a number of features. The reactor's name comes from its electrical output, nominally 1220 MWe.

Originally part of an aggressive expansion plan including as many as eight BN-Reactors starting construction in 2012, plans for the BN-1200 were repeatedly scaled back until only two were ordered. The first was to begin construction at the Beloyarsk nuclear power plant in 2015, with initial commissioning in 2017, followed by a second unit at the same location. A possible new station known as South Ural would host another two BN-1200s at some future point.

In 2015, after several minor delays, problems at the recently completed BN-800 indicated a redesign of the fuel was needed. Construction of the BN-1200 was put on "indefinite hold", and Rosenergoatom stated that no decision to continue would be made before 2019. In January 2022, Rosatom announced that a pilot BN-1200M would be built by 2035.

Background
Fast reactors of the BN series use a core running on enriched fuels like highly (80%) or, at least, medium (20%) enriched uranium or plutonium. This design produces many neutrons that are able to escape the core area due to its basic geometry and details of operating cycle. These neutrons are then used to create additional reactions in a "blanket" of material, normally natural or even depleted uranium or thorium, where respectively new plutonium- or uranium 233 atoms are formed. These atoms have different chemical behavior and can be extracted from the blanket material through basic reprocessing. The resulting plutonium metal can then be mixed with other fuels and used in conventional reactor designs.

For the breeding reaction to be positive, producing more fuel than it uses, the neutrons released from the core should retain as much energy as they can. Additionally, as the core is very compact, the heating loads are very high. These requirements both lead to the use of liquid sodium as a coolant, as this is both an excellent conductor of heat, as well as being largely transparent to neutrons. Sodium is highly reactive, and careful design is needed to build a primary cooling loop that can be safely operated. Alternate designs use lead.

Although the plutonium produced by breeders is useful for weapons, there are more traditional designs, notably the graphite-moderated reactor, that generate plutonium more easily. However, these designs deliberately operate at low energy levels for safety reasons, and are not useful for economic electrical generation. It is the breeder's ability to produce more new fuel than was spent while also producing electricity that makes it economically interesting. However, to date the low cost of uranium fuel has made this unattractive.

History

Previous designs
The successive Soviet and Russian governments have been experimenting with breeders since the 1960s. In 1973, the first prototype of a power-producing reactor was constructed, the BN-350 reactor, which operated successfully until 1999. This reactor suffered an almost continual series of fires in its sodium coolant, but due to its safety features these were contained. Experience gained in the BN-350 led to a somewhat larger design, the BN-600 reactor, which went into operation in 1980 and continues to run to this day.

Design of a larger plant with the explicit goal of economic fuel production began in 1983 as the BN-800 reactor, and construction began in 1984. By this time the French Superphénix had recently begun operation. The Super Phenix had several startup problems and took some time to reach operational reliability. A slump in uranium prices added to the concerns, making the breeder concept economically infeasible. The Chernobyl disaster in 1986 led to construction being stopped until new safety systems could be added.

BN-800 underwent a major redesign in 1987, and a more minor one in 1993, but construction did not restart until 2006. The reactor did not reach criticality until 2014, and further progress stopped due to problems with the fuel design. It restarted in 2015, and reached full power in August 2016, entering commercial operation.

Design concept
The BN-1200 concept is essentially a further developed BN-800 design with the twin goals of being more economically attractive while also meeting Generation IV reactor safety limits. To improve economics, it uses a new fueling procedure that is simpler than the one on the BN-600 and BN-800 designs, and has an extended design lifetime of 60 years. Safety enhancements are the elimination of outer primary circuit sodium pipelines and a passive emergency heat removal.

The design has a breeding ratio of 1.2 to 1.3–1.35 for mixed uranium-plutonium oxide fuel and 1.45 for nitride fuel. Boron carbide would be used for in-reactor shielding. Thermal power should be nominal 2900 MW with an electric output of 1220 MW. Primary coolant temperature at the intermediate heat exchanger is 550 °C and at the steam generator 527 °C. Gross efficiency is expected to be 42%, net 39%. It is intended to be a Generation IV design and produce electricity at RUR 0.65/kWh (US 2.23 cents/kWh).

The World Nuclear Association lists the BN-1200 as a commercial reactor, in contrast to its predecessors. An even larger design, the BN-1600, was also considered, which was very similar to the BN-1200 in most ways.

Planned construction
OKBM initially expected to commission the first unit with MOX fuel in 2020, bringing on additional units until eight were constructed (11 GWe total output) by 2030. SPb AEP also claims design involvement. Rosenergoatom also considered foreign specialists in its design, with India and China particularly mentioned.

In early 2012, Rosatom's Science and Technology Council approved the construction of a BN-1200 reactor at the Beloyarsk Nuclear Power Station. Technical design was scheduled for completion by 2013, and manufacture of equipment would start in 2014. Construction would begin in 2015 with first fuel loads in 2017 and full commercial operation as early as 2020. A second unit, either a BN-1200 or BN-1600, would follow, along with the possibility of a BREST-300 lead-cooled breeder. These plans were approved by Sverdlovsk regional government in June 2012.

Current status: on hold, design improvements ongoing
The construction of the BN-1200 till design will be improved to reach economics "comparable to VVER-1200". As far as design improvements will get certified, no decision to start construction will be made until 2019.

A total of two BN-1200s remains in Russia's master plan for nuclear buildout, which includes another nine reactors of other types. This report suggests one BN-1200 in two locations, Beloyarsk and South Urals. The rest are a mix of VVER-600 and VVER-TOI.

See also

BN-350 reactor

Generation IV reactor

References

External links
  (A possible updated link: Fast neutron reactors)
 - on OKBM Afrikantov official pdf

Liquid metal fast reactors
Nuclear power in Russia
Science and technology in the Soviet Union
Soviet inventions